Kenneth Emery Nix (December 1, 1919 – December 6, 2005) was an American football quarterback in the National Football League. He played for the New York Giants. He played college football for the TCU Horned Frogs.

References

1919 births
2005 deaths
American football quarterbacks
New York Giants players
TCU Horned Frogs football players
People from Chillicothe, Texas
People from Blanco, Texas